Halden Ishall is an indoor ice hockey arena located in Halden, Norway. It was built in 1988 with an original capacity of 1,200.

It is the home arena of Comet ice hockey team.

Halden Ishall is the smallest of the ten arenas to host GET-ligaen matches, at the end of the 2007–08 season it was expanded to 2,200 seat capacity.

References

External links

Sports venues in Halden
Indoor arenas in Norway
Indoor ice hockey venues in Norway
1988 establishments in Norway
Sports venues completed in 1988